The Eugene G. Fubini Award is an award by the Defense Science Board, named after Eugene G. Fubini, on an annual basis to recognize an individual from the private sector who has made highly significant contributions to the Department of Defense in an advisory capacity over a sustained period of time.

Also in honor of Dr. Fubini, the National Defense Industrial Association (NDIA) presents a different Fubini Award recognizing the NDIA C4ISR Person of the Year.

Nominations
Service Secretaries, Chairman of the Joint Chiefs of Staff, and the General Staff of the Secretary of Defense, and the members and former members of DoD Advisory Boards and Committees may submit candidates for consideration for this award.  Recognized advisory bodies include the Army Science Board, Naval Research Advisory Committee, Air Force Scientific Advisory Board, Defense Science Board, Defense Policy Board, Defense Business Board, Defense Intelligence Agency Advisory Board, Threat Reduction Advisory Committee, and the Intelligence Science Board.

Criteria
Nominees will have contributed recommendations relating to ideas, methods, or processes which reflect exemplary advice across the broad spectrum of the DoD mission. Innovations are expected to meet the needs of the warfighting and peacekeeping communities faster, better, and cheaper; improve the acquisition system; or strengthen the commercial and defense industrial base.

Past winners 
 1996	Eugene G. Fubini
 1997	No award presented
 1998	John S. Foster, Jr.
 1999	Joseph Braddock
 2000  Norman R. Augustine
 2001	Charles A. (Bert) Fowler
 2002	David R. Heebner
 2003	Larry D. Welch
 2004	Robert Hermann
 2005	Craig Fields
 2006	James Burnett
 2007  Theodore Gold
 2008  Robert R. Everett
 2009  James R. Schlesinger
 2010  Daniel J. Fink
 2011 No award presented
 2012 Richard Wagner
 2013 Larry Lynn
 2014 Robert Stein
 2015 Mim John
 2016 Vince Vitto
 2017 James Tegnelia
 2018 William Schneider Jr.

References 

Civil awards and decorations of the United States